Satinský may refer to:

 15946 Satinský, a main belt asteroid
 Július Satinský, a Slovak actor, comedian, showman and writer 
 Satinsky clamp